The oath of enlistment is a military oath made by members of the United States armed forces who are not commissioned officers.

Description
That section provides the text of the oath and sets out who may administer the oath:

Army Regulation 601-210, Active and Reserve Components Enlistment Program provides that:

There is no duration defined in the Oath itself. The term of service for each enlisted person is written on the DD Form 4 series, the contract which specifies the active-duty or reserve enlistment period. For a first-time enlistee, this varies from two to six years,which can be a combination of active duty and time spent in a reserve component, although enlisted reservists are subject to activation until the end of the eight-year initial military obligation.

Officers do not take the same oath as enlisted personnel, instead taking a similar United States Uniformed Services Oath of Office.

See also
United States Uniformed Services Oath of Office
Ceremonial oath of the Bundeswehr

References

External links
 

Enlistment
Military of the United States
Articles containing video clips